The Paute Dam, also known as the Daniel Palacios Dam and the Amaluza Dam, is a hydroelectric dam in Ecuador. It is located on the Paute River,  from Cuenca. After the privatization of power generation that began in 1996 under the government of Sixto Durán Ballén, the dam passed into the hands of the company Hidropaute SA and then returned to state ownership during the government of Rafael Correa when Hidropaute became part of the Ecuador Electricity Corporation (Corporación Eléctrica del Ecuador, CELEC).

Paute was constructed between 1976 and 1983 on the Paute River and designed on the premise that it would be erected upstream of the Mazar Dam. The Paute Dam's supports to  Molina Power Station. In late 2009, low water levels at the dam were the primary cause of an electricity crisis in Ecuador.

See also 

 List of conventional hydroelectric power stations

Notes

External links 
 History of the Paute Dam 

Dams completed in 1983
Energy infrastructure completed in 1983
Energy infrastructure completed in 1991
Dams in Ecuador
Buildings and structures in Azuay Province
Arch-gravity dams
Hydroelectric power stations in Ecuador
1983 establishments in Ecuador